Badal or Baadal may refer to:

Films
 Baadal (1951 film), a Hindi film
 Baadal (1966 film), a Hindi film 
Baadal (1985 film), a 1985 Hindi film directed by Anand Sagar
Badal, a 2000 Bollywood film

Places
 Badal, Uttar Pradesh, a village in India
 Badal or Sants-Badal, a neighbourhood of Barcelona
 Badal (Barcelona Metro), a station in the subway system of Barcelona
 Badal, Haryana, a village in India
 Badal, Punjab, a village in India
 Yeghegnut, Armavir, Armenia, formerly Badal

People
Bazlur Rahman Badal (1920s–2018), Bangladeshi dancer
Gurdas Singh Badal (born 1931), Indian politician of the SAD party
Gurdev Singh Badal (died 2017)
Harsimrat Kaur Badal (born 1966), Indian politician of the SAD party
James Jessen Badal (born 1943), American writer
Jean Badal (1927–2015), Hungarian-born French cinematographer
Joseph Badal (born 1944), American novelist and financier
Keshab Prasad Badal (born 1948), Nepalese politician
Manpreet Singh Badal (born 1962), Indian politician of the Indian National Congress
Parkash Singh Badal (born 1927), Indian politician, Chief Minister of Punjab
Sukhbir Singh Badal (born 1962), Indian politician of the SAD party
Badal Rahman (1949–2010), Bangladeshi film director
Badal Choudhury, Indian politician of the Communist Party of India (Marxist)
Badal Gupta (1912–1930), Bengali revolutionary nationalist
Badal Patralekh, Indian politician of the Indian National Congress party
Badal Roy (born 1945), jazz musician, tabla player
Badal Sarkar (1925–2011), Indian dramatist

Other uses
badal, a main principle of Pashtunwali that encompasses aspects of justice and revenge
In Arabic grammar, a term for a partitive apposition

See also 
 
 Badalbeyli, Azerbaijani surname, compounded from Badal